André Luis Correia Diogo Nunes (born April 14, 1984) is a Brazilian former football player.

André Nunes previously played for Zagłębie Lubin in the Polish Ekstraklasa from where he was transferred in February 2008 at former 2007–08 UEFA Champions League opponent, Steaua București for 100.000€, however he did not play for a single game for The Military Men being immediately loaned at fellow Liga I team, Gloria Buzău.

Honours
Coritiba
Campeonato Paranaense: 2003, 2004
Zagłębie Lubin
Polish SuperCup: 2007

References

External links

1984 births
Living people
Brazilian footballers
Brazilian expatriate footballers
People from Limeira
Coritiba Foot Ball Club players
J. Malucelli Futebol players
Zagłębie Lubin players
FC Steaua București players
FC Gloria Buzău players
Cerro Largo F.C. players
Campeonato Brasileiro Série A players
Ekstraklasa players
Liga I players
Expatriate footballers in Romania
Expatriate footballers in Poland
Expatriate footballers in Uruguay
Expatriate footballers in Venezuela
Brazilian expatriate sportspeople in Romania
Brazilian expatriate sportspeople in Poland
Brazilian expatriate sportspeople in Uruguay
Brazilian expatriate sportspeople in Venezuela
Association football forwards
Footballers from São Paulo (state)